Toney Woodroe Weatherman (born July 29, 1965) is an American musician, best known as the lead guitarist of heavy metal band Corrosion of Conformity.

Career 
Weatherman was born in Raleigh, North Carolina and now lives in Virginia. He started Corrosion of Conformity with Mike Dean and Reed Mullin in 1982 where they began as a hardcore punk and crossover thrash band, but later transformed to a more stoner sludge sound with the addition of Pepper Keenan in 1989. They reformed without Keenan as a three-piece consisting of the original founding members in 2010. However, Keenan returned in 2015.

Weatherman also played bass guitar in the Raleigh-based band No Labels with Reed Mullin, Ricky Hicks, and Wayne Kerr. They formed in February 1982 and faded away during 1984.

He played on the 1989 Snake Nation album along with Corrosion of Conformity bassist Mike Dean and artist Brian Walsby.

References

External links 
Corrosion of Conformity official website
Gallery of Weatherman with Corrosion of Conformity on Alberta Stars
Interview with Weatherman on MT Radio

American heavy metal guitarists
Living people
Lead guitarists
Musicians from Raleigh, North Carolina
1965 births
Guitarists from North Carolina
20th-century American guitarists
Corrosion of Conformity members